Pervomaysky is a rural locality (a village) in Yangilsky Selsoviet, Abzelilovsky District, Bashkortostan, Russia. The population was 362 as of 2010. There are 4 streets.

Geography 
Pervomaysky is located 32 km southeast of Askarovo (the district's administrative centre) by road. Yangelskoye is the nearest rural locality.

References 

Rural localities in Abzelilovsky District